The International Commission against the Death Penalty (ICDP) was founded in Madrid in October 2010, as a result of a Spanish initiative. ICDP is an independent body composed of Commissioners of high standing who have experience in international law and human rights, and are committed to achieving the universal abolition of capital punishment. Their experience, background, geographical representation and personal involvement in abolishing the death penalty enables them to engage with senior officials from different countries.

Support Group
The Commission is supported by a diverse group of countries representing all regions of the world. They are united in opposing capital punishment in all circumstances, and urge for the immediate establishment of a universal moratorium on executions as a step towards total abolition of the death penalty.

ICDP Commissioners 
 President and Vice-Presidents
 Navanethem "Navi" Pillay (South Africa). Former UN High Commissioner for Human Rights and well-known judge in the ICC and President of the International Criminal Tribunal of Rwanda.
 Ruth Dreifuss (Switzerland). Former President and Minister of Home Affairs of the Swiss Confederation.
 Ibrahim Najjar (Lebanon). Former Minister of Justice.
 Commissioners
 Marc Baron Bossuyt
 Helen Clark
 Marzuki Darusman
 Michèle Duvivier Pierre-Louis (Haiti). Former Prime Minister of Haiti.
 Tsakhiagiin Elbegdorj
 Hanne Sophie Greve (Norway). A judge and Vice President of the High Court for Western Norway and has served as a judge at the European Court of Human Rights.
 Sylvie Kayitesi
 Ioanna Kuçuradi (Turkey). UNESCO Chairperson of the Philosophy and Human Rights Department and Director of the Centre of Research and Implementation of Human Rights in Maltepe University (Turkey).
 Gloria Macapagal Arroyo (Philippines). Former President of the Philippines.
 Martin O'Malley
 Marta Santos Pais
 Ivan Šimonović
 Horacio Verbitsky (Argentina). Journalist and writer, current member of the Board of Directors of Human Rights Watch/ America and chair of the Center for Legal and Social Studies (CELS).
 Honorary Members
 Giuliano Amato (Italy). Former Prime Minister of Italy.
 Louise Arbour (Canada). Former UN High Commissioner for Human Rights and Former Chief Prosecutor of the International Criminal Tribunals for the former Yugoslavia and Rwanda.
 Robert Badinter (France). Former Minister of Justice of France.
 Mohammed Bedjaoui (Algeria). Former Foreign Minister of Algeria, Former Judge and President of the International Court of Justice.
 Federico Mayor (Spain) President of ICDP. Former Director General of the UNESCO and Former Minister of Education and Science of Spain.
 Bill Richardson (USA). Former Governor of New Mexico.
 Jose Luis Rodriguez Zapatero (Spain), Former Prime Minister of Spain.
 Marta Vilardell
 Founding Members
 Rodolfo Mattarollo (Founding Member 1939–2014) (Argentina). Ambassador for UNASUR in Haiti and Former Deputy Secretary for Human Rights in Argentina.
 Asma Jilani Jahangir (Pakistan). President of the Human Rights Commission of Pakistan and Former UN Special Rapporteur on extrajudicial, arbitrary and summary executions.

Work and country missions
The work of ICDP is varied: letters and statements about specific cases are issued urging states not to carry out executions and condemning executions carried out. ICDP organizes and attends meetings and events to promote the abolition of the death penalty.

ICDP conducts country missions (California and Delaware in the US, Japan, Suriname, Tajikistan, Tunisia and Lebanon, among others) and engage dialogue with different stakeholders working on the abolition, such as NGOs, government representatives, and members of parliament. For example, Commissioner Ruth Dreifuss visited Tajikistan in 2011 and 2013 "to advocate for full abolition of the death penalty in the national law". Several reports and opinion pieces have been published by ICDP, including a report on how States abolish the death penalty "which reviews the processes towards abolition of capital punishment" in a wide range of countries.

References

External links
 

Anti–death penalty organizations
Capital punishment
Opposition to the death penalty
International commissions